The Countess of Monte Cristo is a 1934 American comedy film directed by Karl Freund and starring Fay Wray, Paul Lukas and Reginald Owen. The film was a remake of a 1932 German film The Countess of Monte Cristo. It was remade in 1948 under the same title.

Synopsis
In Austria a struggling actress borrows the fancy clothes and car from her film set, and goes to stay in a luxury hotel under the name "Countess of Monte Cristo".

Cast
 Fay Wray as Janet Krueger  
 Paul Lukas as Rumowski  
 Reginald Owen as The Baron  
 Patsy Kelly as Mimi  
 Paul Page as Stefan  
 John Sheehan as Sterner  
 Carmel Myers as Flower Girl  
 Robert McWade as Hotel Manager  
 Frank Reicher as Police Commissioner  
 Richard Tucker as Picture Director  
 Matthew Betz as Rumowski's Valet  
 Bobby Watson as Hotel Valet  
 Harvey Clark as Newspaper Editor 
 Dewey Robinson as Proprietor of Exchange

See also
 The Countess of Monte Cristo (1932)
 The Countess of Monte Cristo (1948)
 Just Once a Great Lady (1957)

References

Bibliography
 Dick, Bernard F. City of Dreams: The Making and Remaking of Universal Pictures. University Press of Kentucky, 2015.

External links
 

1934 films
1930s crime comedy films
1930s English-language films
Films directed by Karl Freund
American remakes of German films
American black-and-white films
Films set in Vienna
American crime comedy films
1934 comedy films
Films scored by Edward Ward (composer)
1930s American films